Epimedium franchetii is a species of flowering plant in the family Berberidaceae, native to Hubei and Guizhou provinces of China. Its cultivar 'Brimstone Butterfly' has gained the Royal Horticultural Society's Award of Garden Merit.

References

franchetii
Endemic flora of China
Flora of South-Central China
Plants described in 1996